Kollukkadu is a village in the Pattukkottai taluk of Thanjavur district, Tamil Nadu, India.

Demographics 

As per the 2001 census, Kollukkadu had a total population of 1804 with 920 males and 884 females. The sex ratio was 961. The literacy rate was 72.88.

References 

 

Villages in Thanjavur district